The men's mass start race of the 2013–14 ISU Speed Skating World Cup 6, arranged in the Thialf arena, in Heerenveen, Netherlands, was held on 14 March 2014.

Bob de Vries of the Netherlands won the race, while Maarten Swings of Belgium came second, and Bram Smallenbroek of Austria came third.

Results
The race took place on Friday, 14 March, scheduled at 18:20.

References

Men mass start
6